Antrobus Hall is a country house in the village of Mobberley, Cheshire, England.  It was built in 1709, and a wing was added in about 1760.  It was built for John Antrobus, a dissenter from Knutsford.  The hall is constructed in brick, and has a stone-flagged roof.  The house, together with its garden walls and gate piers, are recorded in the National Heritage List for England as a designated Grade II* listed building.  The house has five bays on the ground floor, and four on its upper floor.  The gate piers are rusticated.

See also

Grade II* listed buildings in Cheshire East
Listed buildings in Mobberley

References

Houses completed in 1709
Grade II* listed buildings in Cheshire
Grade II* listed houses
Country houses in Cheshire
1709 establishments in England